Aleksandar Totic is one of the original developers of the Mosaic browser. He cofounded and was a partner at Netscape Communications Corporation.
He was born in Belgrade, Serbia, on 23 September 1966. He moved to America after his degree from Kuwait was not recognized by Yugoslav government, and currently lives in Palo Alto, CA San Francisco, CA.

External links 
Mosaic - The First Global Web Browser 

Software engineers
Serbian computer scientists
Computer programmers
Living people
Year of birth missing (living people)
Place of birth missing (living people)